The 2009–10 USC Trojans men's basketball team represented the University of Southern California in the 2009–10 NCAA Division I men's basketball season. The Trojans are a member of the Pacific-10 Conference. USC finished the season 16–14 and 8–10 in the Pac-10 but did not participate in the 2010 Pacific-10 Conference men's basketball tournament due to self-imposed sanctions.

Offseason
June 9: Head coach, Tim Floyd, has resigned. His letter of resignation was published by the Clarion-Ledger newspaper in Mississippi. USC Athletic Director Mike Garrett accepted the resignation and said that he will quickly begin the search for a new head basketball coach. Kevin O'Neill was named the new head coach of the men's basketball team.

Regular season

 In the early signing period, USC received four letter-of-intents for the next season: guard Bryce Jones (Woodland Hils, Calif./William Howard Taft), guard Maurice Jones (Saginaw, Mich./Arthur Hill), forward Curtis Washington of Elizabethtown, Ky./Elizabethtown) and forward Garrett Jackson (Portland, Ore./Westview). USC also is expecting Dwayne Polee (Los Angeles/Westchester to sign.
 On January 3, 2010, USC Athletic Director Mike Garrett announced that the school is forfeiting the 2007–08 season's victories, not participating in this year's post season tournaments, and reducing the number of scholarships for two years for violation of NCAA rules.
 January 4, 2010 – Rory Markas, play-by-play voice for the USC men's basketball team, died.

Class of 2009

|-
| colspan="7" style="padding-left:10px;" | Overall Recruiting Rankings:     Scout – UR     Rivals – UR       ESPN – UR 
|}

Roster

Schedule

Players drafted into the NBA

References

External links
Official Site

USC Trojans men's basketball seasons
USC
USC Trojans
USC Trojans